Kevin Patrick Rush (29 March 1901 – 21 August 1984) was  a former Australian rules footballer who played with Richmond in the Victorian Football League (VFL).

Family
The son of Roger Robert Rush (1856-1941), and Mary Rush (1856-1943), née Berry, Kevin Patrick Rush was born on 29 March 1901.

Wife
He married Elaine Howell on 12 May 1932.

Siblings
Four of his seven brothers also played VFL football (They are the only set of five brothers to play in the VFL/AFL):
 Robert Thomas "Bob" Rush (1880–1975) (1890–1983), who played with Collingwood from 1899 to 1908.
 William Leopold "Leo" Rush (1890–1983), who played with Melbourne in 1911, and with Richmond in 1912.
 Bryan Joseph Rush (1893–1982), played with Collingwood in 1913 and 1914.
 Gerald Vincent Rush (1895–1988), played with Richmond in 1920.

Medicine
He graduated Bachelor of Medicine and Bachelor of Surgery (MBBS) in 1924, and Master of Surgery in December 1936, and was admitted to Fellowship of the Royal Australasian College of Surgeons in June 1947.

See also
 List of Australian rules football families

Notes

References	
 Hogan P: The Tigers Of Old, Richmond FC, (Melbourne), 1996. 
 </ref>

External links 
		

1901 births
1984 deaths
Australian rules footballers from Victoria (Australia)
Richmond Football Club players
Old Xaverians Football Club players
Melbourne Medical School alumni
20th-century Australian medical doctors
Australian surgeons